Chicheley is a village in the Borough of Milton Keynes in Buckinghamshire, England.

Chicheley may also refer to:
Henry Chicheley (1614/1615–1683), Lieutenant Governor and Acting Governor of Virginia Colony
Sir Thomas Chicheley (1614–1699), MP, Master of the Ordnance, High Sheriff of Cambridgeshire

See also
Chicheley Hall
Chichele